The Dundas Cactus Festival occurs on the third weekend of August in Dundas, Ontario, Canada. The midway is opened on Wednesday and with King Street blocked off from York Road to Market Street, there is a parade on Thursday evening.

Following that, from Friday to Sunday, there are live musicians, buskers, arts & crafts, games, vendors and even some charity gambling to entertain the public.

History
The Dundas Cactus Festival began in 1976 as a festival to mark the beginning of summer.  In 1979 the festival was moved to August with local downtown merchants having sidewalk sales to coincide with it.

The name 'Dundas Cactus Festival' is inspired by the activities of Barend (Ben) Veldhuis, a Dutch immigrant who ran a large greenhouse specializing in cacti, who was the reason Dundas became known as "the cactus capital of the universe".

External links
Dundas Cactus Festival official website
 

Busking venues
Summer festivals
Recurring events established in 1976
Festivals in Hamilton, Ontario
Festivals established in 1976
Dundas, Ontario